Jeff Carter (born 1985) is an ice hockey player.

Jeff Carter may also refer to:

 Jeff Carter (photographer) (1928–2010), Australian 
 Jeff Carter (pitcher) (born 1964), American baseball player
 Jeff Carter (bowler) (born 1969), American ten-pin bowler
 Donnel Carter (born 1950), a.k.a. Jeff Carter, the third son of former U.S. President Jimmy Carter

See also
 Geoff Carter (1943–2018), English footballer